The North Dakota Department of Public Instruction (NDDPI), led by Kirsten Baesler, oversees the public school system in the U.S. state of North Dakota. The DPI also oversees the North Dakota State Library, the North Dakota School for the Blind, and the North Dakota School for the Deaf. The DPI is headed by the North Dakota Superintendent of Public Instruction. The DPI is headquartered in Bismarck.

References

External links
North Dakota Department of Public Instruction official website

Public education in North Dakota
State departments of education of the United States
State agencies of North Dakota